Maryland House of Delegates District 27A is one of the 67 districts that compose the Maryland House of Delegates. Along with subdistricts 27B and 27C, it makes up the 27th district of the Maryland Senate. District 27A includes parts of Charles County and Prince George's County, and is represented by one delegate.

Demographic characteristics
As of the 2020 United States census, the district had a population of 50,488, of whom 39,504 (78.2%) were of voting age. The racial makeup of the district was 11,002 (21.8%) White, 31,811 (63.0%) African American, 359 (0.7%) Native American, 1,346 (2.7%) Asian, 18 (0.0%) Pacific Islander, 2,390 (4.7%) from some other race, and 3,545 (7.0%) from two or more races. Hispanic or Latino of any race were 4,077 (8.1%) of the population.

The district had 37,984 registered voters as of October 17, 2020, of whom 5,029 (13.2%) were registered as unaffiliated, 4,956 (13.0%) were registered as Republicans, 27,384 (72.1%) were registered as Democrats, and 474 (1.2%) were registered to other parties.

Past Election Results

1998

2002

2006

2010

2014

2018

References

27A